Rapha–Gitane–Dunlop was a French professional cycling team that existed from 1959 to 1961. It was created as a sister team of the Saint-Raphaël–R. Geminiani–Dunlop.

The Rapha premium cycling brand has taken its name from the Rapha team.

Major results

1960
Mazé Cyclo-cross, Rolf Wolfshohl
 Cyclo-cross National Championships, Rolf Wolfshohl
 UCI Cyclo-cross World Championships, Rolf Wolfshohl
Paris Cyclo-cross, Rolf Wolfshohl
Vincennes Cyclo-cross, Rolf Wolfshohl
Köln Cyclo-cross, Rolf Wolfshohl
Paris–Brussels, Pierre Everaert
 Overall Deutschland Tour, Ab Geldermans
Stage 2, Ab Geldermans
Stage 3, Pierre Everaert
Stage 7, Rudi Altig
Stage 4 Tour de Champagne, Gilbert Scodeller
Liège–Bastogne–Liège, Ab Geldermans
Stages 1 & 6 Tour du Maroc, Alves Barbosa
Stage 2 Tour du Maroc, Antonino Baptista
Stage 3b Quatre Jours de Dunkerque, Roger Rivière
 Overall Tour de l'Aude, Gérard Thiélin
Stage 2, Brian Robinson
 Overall Tour du Sud-Est, Tom Simpson
Stage 3 GP du Midi-Libre, Brian Robinson
Stage 5b Critérium du Dauphiné, Roger Rivière
Stage 7b Critérium du Dauphiné, Raymond Mastrotto
Stage 1b (TTT) Driedaagse van Antwerpen, Rolf Wolfshohl, Tom Simpson & Ab Geldermans
Stages 1b, 6 & 10 Tour de France, Roger Rivière
Hoepertingen Criterium, Jo De Haan
 Overall Grande Prémio Vilar, Alves Barbosa
Stages 3a, 4a, 4b, 5, 7, 8b, 9a & 9b, Alves Barbosa 
Zandvoort Criterium, Jo De Haan
Lommel, Jo De Haan
Nantua Criterium, Rudi Altig
Bussières Criterium:  Raymond Elena
Paris–Tours, Jo De Haan
Middelkerke Cyclo-cross, Rolf Wolfshohl
Battel Cyclo-cross, Rolf Wolfshohl

1961
Mazé Cyclo-cross, Rolf Wolfshohl
 Cyclo-cross National Championships, Rolf Wolfshohl
 UCI Cyclo-cross World Championships, Rolf Wolfshohl
Bordeaux–Saintes, Fernand Delort
Tour of Flanders, Tom Simpson
 Overall Tour de Tunisie, Jean-Claude Lebaube
Stage 1b Quatre Jours de Dunkerque, Tom Simpson
 Overall Critérium du Dauphiné, Brian Robinson
Stage 3, Brian Robinson
Stage 1 Tour de l'Avenir, Jean-Claude Lebaube
Stage 1 Circuit d'Aquitaine, Gérard Thiélin
Harelbeke Cyclo-cross, Rolf Wolfshohl
Middelkerke Cyclo-cross, Rolf Wolfshohl
Giussano Cyclo-cross , Rolf Wolfshohl

References

External links

Cycling teams based in France
Defunct cycling teams based in France
1959 establishments in France
1961 disestablishments in France
Cycling teams established in 1959
Cycling teams disestablished in 1961